Pranab is an Indian name, common among Assamese, Bengalis, Odias and Nepalis. Notable people with the name include:

 Pranab Bardhan (born 1939), Indian economist
 Pranab Mukherjee (1935–2020), Indian politician
 Pranab Roy (born 1963), Indian cricketer

Indian masculine given names